Rubus leviculus is a rare North American species of brambles in the rose family. It has been found only in scattered locations in the eastern and central United States.

The genetics of Rubus is extremely complex, so that it is difficult to decide on which groups should be recognized as species. There are many rare species with limited ranges such as this. Further study is suggested to clarify the taxonomy.

References

External links
photo of herbariumn specimen at Missouri Botanical Garden, collected in Missouri in 2008

leviculus
Plants described in 1943
Flora of the United States